"Ah Me, Ah My" is a song by English band Strawbs written by Tony Hooper. The track first appeared on the Grave New World album, although it was written and recorded a few years earlier. The original recording was later released on the Strawberry Sampler Number 1 album.

Personnel

Tony Hooper – vocals

featuring

"The Gentlemen of the Chorus"
"Tony Visconti's Old Tyme Orchestra" (actually members of the Ted Heath Orchestra)

External links
Lyrics to "Ah Me, Ah My" at Strawbs official website

References

Sleeve notes to album CD 540 934-2 Grave New World (A&M 1998 Remastered)
Grave New World 30th anniversary article on Strawbsweb

Strawbs songs
1972 songs
Songs written by Tony Hooper
Song recordings produced by Gus Dudgeon